Bing Sings the Hits is a Decca Records album by Bing Crosby of hit songs from the early 1950s. It was issued as a 10-inch LP with catalog number DL 5520.

Background
Crosby’s record company had issued an almost constant stream of 10” LPs in previous years often using his back catalog extensively with a newer song or two added to enhance the commercial appeal. This album comprised contemporary songs newly recorded by Crosby. The first six tracks on the album were recorded with John Scott Trotter and His Orchestra for use on Crosby’s radio program and were mastered by Decca on December 31, 1953 for commercial release.

Reception
Billboard commented: “Many of Bing’s fans will be interested in this collection of top hits of the day, sung by the “Groaner” with his usual light-hearted, but sincere air…Should be a brisk seller.” Retail rating 78 (out of 100).

Track listing for 10" LP
Recording dates follow track titles.

Personnel
John Scott Trotter and His Orchestra

Red Nichols (cornet); Bobby Guy, Ziggy Elman (trumpets); Ted Vesley, Joseph F. Howard, Wendell Mayhew (trombones); Matty Matlock, Phil Shuken, Warren Baker, David Harris, Larry Wright (reeds); Jacques Gasselin, Harry Bluestone, Murray Kellner, Mayer Oberman, Henry Hill, Mischa Russell (violins); David Sterkin (viola); Cy Bernard (cello); Buddy Cole (piano); Perry Botkin (guitar); Phil Stephens (string bass); Nick Fatool (drums)

References 

Bing Crosby compilation albums
Decca Records compilation albums
1954 compilation albums